Peeplu is a town in Rajasthan State of India. Peeplu serves as the Tehsil Headquarter, with 126 villages. It belongs to the Tonk District and Ajmer Division. It is 20 km from the National Highway 12 (Jaipur to Kota section), 70 km from Jaipur and 18 km from Tonk District.

References

 Tehsils of Rajasthan